The 2006 March on Madrid Hockey Tournament was a women's field hockey tournament, consisting of a series of test matches. It was held in Baltimore and Virginia Beach, from 17 to 27 August 2006.

The Netherlands won the tournament, defeating Argentina 4–2 in the final. Australia finished in third place after defeating the United States 4–2 in the third place match.

Competition format
The tournament featured the national teams of Argentina, Australia, the Netherlands and the United States. The teams competed in a double round-robin format, with each team playing each other twice. Three points were awarded for a win, one for a draw, and none for a loss.

Teams

Head Coach: Gabriel Minadeo

Head Coach: Frank Murray

Head Coach: Marc Lammers

Head Coach: Lee Bodimeade

Officials
The following umpires were appointed by the International Hockey Federation to officiate the tournament:

 Stella Bartlema (NED)
 Mariana Elorza (ARG)
 Dorinda Martin (USA)
 Carol Metchette (IRE)
 Melissa Trivic (AUS)

Results

Preliminary round

Fixtures

Classification round

Third and fourth place

Final

Statistics

Final standings

Goalscorers

References

External links
Official website

Field hockey in the United States
Women's international field hockey competitions